Marina Nichișenco, née Marghiev (Marina Soslanovna Margieva; born 28 June 1986) is a female hammer thrower who competes for Moldova. Her personal best throw is 71.50 metres, achieved in January 2009 in Chişinău. She is a former national record holder. Born in Russia, she is the older sister of Zalina Marghieva and Serghei Marghiev, and is coached by her father Soslan.

Nichișenco was due to compete at the 2012 Olympic Games but was withdrawn by her National Olympic Committee after her A-sample tested positive for stanozolol during a drug test. She was suspended for 2 years.

Achievements

Note: Was scheduled to compete, withdrawn due to positive results from a drug test.

References

External links 
 
 

1986 births
Living people
Moldovan female hammer throwers
Athletes (track and field) at the 2008 Summer Olympics
Athletes (track and field) at the 2016 Summer Olympics
Olympic athletes of Moldova
Doping cases in athletics
People from Vladikavkaz
World Athletics Championships athletes for Moldova
Russian emigrants to Moldova
Moldovan sportspeople in doping cases
European Games competitors for Moldova
Athletes (track and field) at the 2015 European Games
Competitors at the 2007 Summer Universiade
Competitors at the 2009 Summer Universiade
Competitors at the 2011 Summer Universiade